Lolly Scramble: A Memoir of Little Consequence, published in 2005, is collection of autobiographical essays by New Zealand-Australian comedian Tony Martin. A second volume, A Nest of Occasionals, appeared in 2009.

The people mentioned in the book are not referred to by their real names.

Contents

Next Teller Please
Tells of the decline in use of passbooks in banking.

Something Of Dreams
A New Zealand TV show shoots a scene in the neighbourhood of Martin's friend from Thames South Primary.

Mono
Martin and his friend befriend a peer whose religion forbids board games, television and movies, who is rumoured to possess only one testicle.

Longnecks
14-year-old Martin discusses 18-year-old Donna, who he has a crush on, with her 29-year-old boyfriend, and later attempts to engage her in conversation.

The Secret Passage
Martin's experience with New Zealand amateur theatre.

A Made Bed in Hell
Martin moves into a rented room at the Yeoman household in Auckland.

No Tarzan, Mind
An account of Martin's time in the advertising industry, starting at the bottom rung, and learning kerning.

The Yeti
Martin's experience at an Auckland boarding house run by a Swiss-German husband and Samoan wife.

Breakfast in Dubbo
An account of a lengthy New South Wales Bus trip.

Unlucky 12a
Martin's time spent living in a flat in Melbourne.

Prang
The events following a minor collision with a drunk driver.

The Doctor is Out
Martin's experience of visiting various chiropractors to cure recurring back pain.

The Notary Public
Martin and his wife require legal forms to be signed by the "notary public".

Any Old Iron
Martin undergoes treatment for haemochromatosis.

Donkey Shines
Martin's experience with video game addiction, including Pong, Space Invaders, Donkey Kong, and GoldenEye 007.

In the Eye of the Lolly Scramble
Parental punishment in combined families, and Christmas cheer.

External links 
 Lolly Scramble page at Pan Macmillan
 Review at Pop Matters
 Review at The Groggy Squirrel

Australian memoirs
2005 non-fiction books
Pan Books books